Henry Fisher may refer to:

Henry Fisher (MP) for Reigate, Saltash and Knaresborough
Henry Fisher (MP for Maidstone), in 1563, MP for Maidstone
Henry Fisher (judge) (1918–2005), British lawyer, judge of the High Court of England and Wales and President of Wolfson College, Oxford
Henry Francis Fisher (1805–1867), German Texan

See also

Harry Fisher (disambiguation)
Henry Fischer (disambiguation)